William Davidson (September 12, 1778 – September 16, 1857) was a U.S. Representative from North Carolina.

Born in Charleston, South Carolina, Davidson completed preparatory studies.
He moved with his parents to North Carolina in early youth and settled in Mecklenburg County.
He engaged extensively in planting.
He served as member of the State senate in 1813 from 1815 to 1819, and 1825.
He moved to Charlotte, North Carolina, in 1820.

Davidson was elected as a Federalist to the Fifteenth Congress to fill the vacancy caused by the resignation of Daniel M. Forney.
He was reelected to the Sixteenth Congress and served from December 2, 1818, to March 3, 1821.
He was an unsuccessful candidate for reelection in 1820 to the Seventeenth Congress.

Davidson was again elected a member of the State senate and served from 1827 to 1830.
He resumed his business pursuits. He died in Charlotte, North Carolina on September 16, 1857 and is interred in Old Settlers' Cemetery in that city.

Sources

1778 births
1857 deaths
Federalist Party members of the United States House of Representatives from North Carolina